Ariane (Ariadne) is an opera by the French composer Jean-Joseph Mouret, first performed at the Académie Royale de Musique (the Paris Opera) on 6 April 1717. It takes the form of a tragédie en musique in a prologue and five acts. The libretto is by François Joseph Lagrange-Chancel and Pierre-Charles Roy.

Sources
 Félix Clément and Pierre Larousse Dictionnaire des Opéras, Paris, 1881, page 48.

French-language operas
Tragédies en musique
Operas by Jean-Joseph Mouret
Operas
1717 operas